The Midway noctuid moth (Agrotis fasciata), also known as Midway mudworm, is a species of moth in the family Noctuidae. It is now possibly extinct and was endemic to Midway Atoll.

References

Agrotis
Endemic moths of Hawaii
Moths described in 1894
Taxonomy articles created by Polbot